Kevin Payne is an American politician and a Republican member of the Arizona House of Representatives elected to represent District 27 in 2022. He previously represented District 21 from 2017 to 2023.

Elections
 2016 Payne and incumbent Tony Rivero were unopposed in the Republican Primary and went on to defeat Democrat Deanna Rasmussen-Lacotta in the general election.

References

External links
 Biography at Ballotpedia

Republican Party members of the Arizona House of Representatives
Living people
Year of birth missing (living people)
21st-century American politicians